The 1992 South Africa rugby union tour of France and England was a series of matches played in October and November 1992 in France and England by the South Africa national rugby union team. The 1992 tour was South Africa's first tour to France since 1974 and to England since 1969–70.

Touring party

Coach: John Williams
Assistant coach: Ian Kirkpatrick
Manager: Abie Malan
Assistant manager: Jackie Abrahams

Results
Scores and results list South Africa's points tally first.

Test Matches

First Test: France

Second Test: France

England

See also
History of rugby union matches between France and South Africa
History of rugby union matches between England and South Africa

References 

1992 rugby union tours
1992
1992
1992
1992 in South African rugby union